Garita is a district of the Alajuela canton, in the Alajuela province of Costa Rica.

History 
Garita was created on 6 November 1922 by Decreto 28.

Geography 
Garita has an area of  km² and an elevation of  metres.

Demographics 

For the 2011 census, Garita had a population of  inhabitants.

Transportation

Road transportation 
The district is covered by the following road routes:
 National Route 1
 National Route 3
 National Route 136
 National Route 721

References 

Districts of Alajuela Province
Populated places in Alajuela Province